Rana Ratan Singh II (died 1531) was the Maharana (r. 1528 – 1531) of Mewar Kingdom. He was a son of Rana Sanga. He was killed during a war in 1531. He was succeeded by his surviving brother Vikramaditya Singh. His wives were Rani Guman Kanwar and Maharani Suja Bai of Bundi.

References 

  
 

Mewar dynasty

1531 deaths
Year of birth unknown